The Angry Hills is a 1959 American-British war film directed by Robert Aldrich and starring Robert Mitchum, Stanley Baker and Elisabeth Müller. It is based on the novel by Leon Uris.

Plot
Set in Greece in 1941, before and after the Axis invasion, the film follows an American journalist who possesses a list of Greek resistance leaders. Having memorized the list he destroys it and is then pursued by various groups of people keen to have it: Communist resistance fighters, the Gestapo and Greek collaborators.

Cast
 Robert Mitchum as Mike Morrison 
 Stanley Baker as Conrad Heisler 
 Elisabeth Müller as Lisa Kyriakides 
 Gia Scala as Eleftheria 
 Theodore Bikel as Dimitrios Tassos 
 Sebastian Cabot as Chesney 
 Peter Illing as Leonides 
 Leslie Phillips as Ray Taylor 
 Donald Wolfit as Dr. Stergion 
 Marius Goring as Colonel Elrick Oberg 
 Jocelyn Lane as Maria Tassos 
 Kieron Moore as Andreas 
 George Pastell as Papa Panos
 Patrick Jordan as Bluey 
 Marita Constantinou as Cleopatra 
 Stanley Van Beers as Tavern Proprietor   
 Alec Mango as Phillibos 
 Kostas Gousgounis as Agent(uncredited)

Production
Uris' novel was published in 1955. Because of its Greek setting, Uris was hired to write the screenplay for Boy on a Dolphin.

Film rights were bought by Raymond Stross in England, who said he wanted Clark Gable for the lead. Stross eventually set up the film with MGM and New York's Cine World Productions, and announced Robert Mitchum would star. According to Mitchum, Alan Ladd was meant to play the lead but the producers drove out to Ladd's house and met him after "he'd just crawled out of his swimming pool and was all shrunken up like a dishwasher's hand. They decided he wouldn't do for the big war correspondent. So, what happened? Some idiot said, 'Ask Mitchum to play it. That bum will do anything if he has five minutes free.' Well I had five minutes free so I did it."

Pier Angeli was wanted for the female lead. Elizabeth Mueller was cast instead.

Leon Uris did the first draft of the screenplay. However Aldrich had it rewritten by A.I. Bezzerides, who had written Kiss Me Deadly for Aldrich.

The film was shot from June to December 1958 with location shooting in Greece and interiors at MGM-British Studios.

Robert Aldrich had just made Ten Seconds to Hell in Germany. He later recalled:

Box office
According to MGM records the film earned $510,000 in the US and Canada and $775,000 elsewhere, resulting in a loss of $497,000.

It had admissions of 588,260 in France.

Legacy
Robert Aldrich later said the film was "disappointing not because it's not a good picture but because it could have been good. It had a potential that was never remotely realised... you feel sad about The Angry Hills... I'd know how to make The Angry Hills better in a thousand ways."

References

External links

The Angry Hills at TCMDB
Review of film in New York Times
Review of film at Variety

1959 films
Films shot in Greece
Films shot in Athens
American World War II films
American black-and-white films
British World War II films
British black-and-white films
Metro-Goldwyn-Mayer films
1959 war films
British war drama films
American war drama films
Films directed by Robert Aldrich
Films scored by Richard Rodney Bennett
Films set in Axis-occupied Greece
Films shot at MGM-British Studios
1950s English-language films
1950s American films
1950s British films